The year 1959 saw a number of significant happenings in radio broadcasting history.

Events
3 February – A light-aircraft crash near Clear Lake, Iowa, kills three musicians: Buddy Holly, Ritchie Valens and KTRM-Beaumont deejay JP "The Big Bopper" Richardson, Jr., as well as the plane's pilot. The tragedy will go on to become known as "The Day The Music Died".
11 May – At 10 am, KROW 960 AM in San Francisco switches its call letters to KABL. The KABL name will stay with the station until September 2004.

Debuts
German-American musicologist Karl Haas starts Adventures in Good Music at WJR in Detroit, Michigan.
14 March – Tulane University's WTUL signs on for the first time. Owned and operated by Tulane University, this progressive-music station. will give Jerry Springer his start in broadcasting.
3 April – Pick of the Week is first broadcast on the BBC Home Service.
 7 June KKLS signs on in Rapid City

Closings
2 January – CBS ends Our Gal Sunday, This Is Nora Drake, Backstage Wife and Road of Life.
2 January – The Kate Smith Show ends its run on network radio (Mutual).
9 January – The Howard Miller Show ends its run on network radio (CBS).

Births
 2 January – Joe Bevilacqua, award-winning American voice actor, radio producer, dramatist, humorist and documentary film producer.
 9 January – Andy Kershaw, English world music presenter.
 27 January – Cris Collinsworth, American sportscaster, previously American football player.
 28 January – Randi Rhodes, American radio host.
 22 May – Graham Fellows, English comedy performer.
 3 June – John Carlson, American conservative talk radio host on KVI in Seattle.
 7 June – Mike Pence, American politician who began his career on the radio station WIFE-FM (WRCR-FM).
 13 August – Danny Bonaduce, American comedian, actor and broadcast personality.

Deaths
 9 January – Hans Bredow, "father of German radio" (born 1879).
 3 March – Lou Costello, American comic actor (The Abbott and Costello Show), heart attack (born 1906).
 6 December – Len Doyle, American actor, played investigator Harrigan on Mr. District Attorney (born 1893).

References

 
Radio by year